Asthma camp is a summer camp that is specialized for children with severe versions of asthma.  Typically categorized as a special needs summer camp.  The camp counselor role is fulfilled by respiratory therapists and registered nurses in order to provide a safe and positive experience for children who would otherwise not be able to go to a summer camp.  Asthma camps aim to provide a positive experience for children with asthma through activities like hiking, swimming, canoeing, rope games, arts and crafts, campfires and more all with special considerations and attention to asthma.  Children that attend asthma camps tend to have improved asthma self-management skills and an increase in overall quality of life.

Medical considerations
Asthma camps are led by respiratory therapists and nurses who provide medical education, management and oversight for attendees.  The camps should not have any element that can trigger asthma attacks such as pollen or animal dander; this is maintained by camp staff with medical oversight by the medically trained staff.  Over half of cases in children in the United States occur in areas with air quality below EPA standards, therefore the best locations for these camps are in the top cities for raising a child with asthma.

A 2017 systematic meta-review has revealed that supported self-management can reduce hospitalisations, accident and emergency attendances and unscheduled consultations, and improve markers of control and quality of life for people with asthma across a range of cultural, demographic and healthcare settings. Core components are patient education, provision of an action plan and regular professional review.

Asthma camps

United States

Approximately 120 asthma camps presently serve nearly 10,000 children in the United States.
Missouri
AAFA Superkids Asthma Day Camp — Kansas City, Missouri
Montana
Camp Huff N Puff — Helena, Montana
Tennessee
Camp Wezbegon — Knoxville, Tennessee
Texas
Camp Broncho of North Texas — Dallas, Texas
Camp Asthma Buster/Campamento de Asma "Buster" — El paso, Texas
Camp Easy Breathers — Corpus Christi, Texas
Arizona
Camp-Not-A-Wheeze — Heber, Arizona

References

Respiratory therapy
Summer camps
Summer camps for children with special needs